The Bellevue Community School District (also known as Bellevue Community Schools, or BCSD) is a rural public school district and serves the city and surrounding area of Bellevue, Iowa. It is second largest public school district in Jackson County, Iowa. It operates two buildings serving grades PK-12 and 3-4 year old preschool. Bellevue High School holds both the junior high and high school as well as an athletics complex on its campus, while Bellevue Elementary School is located downtown within the pre-Civil War Jackson County Courthouse building. The district is overseen by the Iowa Department of Education.

Area
The district currently serves the city of Bellevue and most of rural northeastern Jackson County. The district also serves the cities of La Motte and Springbrook. The district has held a sharing agreement with Andrew Community School District since 2011 when Andrew's high school closed, allowing 9-12 grade students to choose between attending Bellevue High School or Maquoketa High School in Maquoketa. The district shares borders with Dubuque Community School District to the north, Andrew Community School District to the west, and Easton Valley Community School District to the south, with the Mississippi River and the state border with Illinois to the east.

Administration
School board elections are held every year in November to fill in vacant seats on the 5 member school board. The school board meets regularly at 6:30 PM Central Time on the second Monday of every month. These meetings are held at Bellevue High School's District Boardroom, located at 1601 State Street in Bellevue. In addition, the School Board holds special meetings and work sessions throughout the year as needed. These meetings are open to the public unless otherwise noted and agendas/minutes are available on the district's website.

List of schools
Bellevue Elementary School

Bellevue High School

Bellevue High School

Athletics
The Comets compete in the River Valley Conference. The Boys Cross Country team won the Class 1A State Champions in 2014.

Facts and figures

Enrollment

See also

 Lists of school districts in the United States
 List of school districts in Iowa
 List of high schools in Iowa

References

External links
 Bellevue Community School District Website

School districts in Iowa
Education in Jackson County, Iowa
School districts established in 1861
1861 establishments in Iowa